Kirby Bellars is a village and civil parish near Melton Mowbray in Leicestershire, England. The population of the civil parish at the 2011 census was 369.

History
The village is recorded in the Domesday Book under the name of Chirchebi. The name Bellars probably originates from Roger de Beler who owned the manor house and founded the priory in 1316.

The large and ancient Parish Church of Saint Peter's, was built in the 13th century and developed by the Priory in the 14th, 15th and 16th centuries, probably as their own chapel. It is made of ironstone and has a tall spire. It is now a Grade I listed building.

John Marius Wilson's Imperial Gazetteer of England and Wales (1870-1872) said of Kirby Bellars:

Present day
Part of the district of Melton, Kirby Bellars also has its own elected parish council. The Village Hall in the Main Street, opposite to Hunters Rise, is used for many local purposes and can seat 150 people.

The pub is called 'The Flying Childers' after the undefeated 18th century racehorse.

In Gaddesby Lane are the kennels of the Quorn Hunt, which claims to be the most famous fox hunt in the United Kingdom. 

Near the village is a wetland area called Priory Lakes, where the Leicestershire Wildfowler's Association has its office.

The 'Kirby Bellars Group of Artists' has existed since the 1980s and includes professional artists as well as amateurs.

References

External links

Kirby Bellars at leicestershirevillages.com
Kirby Bellars at meltononline.co.uk
Kirby Bellars maps and photos at francisfrith.com

Villages in Leicestershire
Civil parishes in Leicestershire
Borough of Melton